Lestrolepis japonica is a species of fish in the family Paralepididae.

References 

Paralepididae
Animals described in 1908